Lucie Václavíková (born ) is a former Czech female volleyball player and assistant coach. She was part of the Czechoslovakia women's national volleyball team.

She participated at the 1986 FIVB Volleyball Women's World Championship, and won the bronze medal at the 1987 Women's European Volleyball Championship and the silver medal at the 1993 Women's European Volleyball Championship.
She participated in the 1994 FIVB Volleyball Women's World Championship. 
On club level she played with Rio Casamia Palermo. After her career she was assistant coach of the Czech national team in 2013, 2014 and 2015.

Clubs
 Rio Casamia Palermo (1994)

References

External links
 profile on ceskatelevize.cz

1967 births
Living people
Czech women's volleyball players
People from Trutnov
Volleyball coaches
Sportspeople from the Hradec Králové Region